This is a list of police officers from the Singapore Police Force who were killed in the line of duty, based on official records from the year 1900 to date. Line of duty deaths refers to any police officer who has died while carrying out duty which he is obligated and/or authorised to carry out. This would include officers who respond to incidents while off-duty as obligated by the Police Force Act, as well as those commuting to and from their place of duty or training.

The Singapore establishment generally avoids personalising or glorifying acts of personal sacrifice in contemporary Singaporean society, and this applies to the police force as well. There had been no public memorial or monument dedicated to police officer deaths until the opening of the Police Heritage Centre in the Police Headquarters at New Phoenix Park on 15 August 2002, where a Commemorative Gallery features a wall inscribed with the names of all fallen officers. Although open to the public, access to the centre is restricted via an appointment-only policy. There are otherwise no readily accessible published lists of all fallen officers' names whether in print or electronically.

Fallen officers are, however, honoured and commemorated through ceremonies or functions, such as a one-minute silence observed during the annual Police Day Parade. Police funerals featuring a flag draped casket, a three-volley salute, and a procession, amongst other elements, may be organised depending on the circumstance of death. Most funerals in recent years are much simpler affairs, partly as many of these deaths are attributed to accidents, but many of these ceremonies still receive local media coverage. Other ways of commemoration may include posthumous promotions and the awarding of state medals; there has been seven posthumous promotions and two posthumous Police Medal of Valour awardees since the 1990s.

Trends

Causes of death

Victims' Profile
The average age of slain police officers is 29.3 years of age, excluding 62 officers whose age were not reported. The highest number of casualties were in the 21–25 age band, making up 31.7% amongst officers whose age were reported, followed closely by those in the 26–30 age band, who make up 28.3%. While relative inexperience may be a factor, the generally young profile of police officers in Singapore and their greater probability of facing operational danger as frontline officers may also contribute to their premature deaths.

The ethnic profile of police officers has been traditionally disproportionate compared to the national ethnic profile, with a significantly higher proportion of ethnic Malays especially in the earlier decades. However, the number of casualties involving ethnic Chinese police officers are statistically higher overall due in part to the high mortality rates involving the ethnic Chinese community during the Japanese Occupation of Singapore in the 1940s, and they make up 60.7% of total deaths.

Notes
 These ranks no longer exist in the present rank structure of the Singapore Police Force (with the exception of some ranks in the Gurkha Contingent).
 Includes two Special Constables.
 Part-time Police National Service was introduced in 1967, and full-time NS in 1975.
 The Volunteer Special Constabulary began in 1946.

Incidents by chronology

The following cases are listed by the date of death, although the incident attributing to death may have occurred earlier. The indicated ranks are as at time of death, and do not include posthumous promotions. Ranks/service numbers are colour-coded based on the cause of death as per the following general classifications. Uncoded entries refer to cases whereby incident details are unknown or unclear:

Key
— denotes information is not available.

1900s

1910s

1920s

1930s

1940s

1950s

1960s

1970s

1980s

1990s

2000s

2010s

References

External links
Singapore Police Force

Crime in Singapore
Police officers killed
Police officers killed
Singapore Police Force
Singaporean police officers killed in the line of duty
Lists of police officers killed in the line of duty
Police officers killed in the line of duty